Roy Thorpe (born 18 May 1934) is a male former British racewalker.

Athletics career
Thorpe represented England at the 1974 British Commonwealth Games in Christchurch, New Zealand, where he won a silver medal in the 20 miles race walk. In the 1976 World Championships in Athletics he placed 32nd in the 50 kilometres race walk.

References

External links 
 
 Profile at The Power of Ten
 Profile at TOPS in athletics

1934 births
Living people
English male racewalkers
British male racewalkers
Commonwealth Games silver medallists for England
Commonwealth Games medallists in athletics
Athletes (track and field) at the 1974 British Commonwealth Games
Medallists at the 1974 British Commonwealth Games